"Air on the G String", also known as "Air for G String" and "Celebrated Air", is August Wilhelmj's 1871 arrangement of the second movement of Johann Sebastian Bach's Orchestral Suite No. 3 in D major, BWV 1068.

The arrangement differs from the original in that the part of the first violins is transposed down so that the entire piece can be played on just the violin's lowest string (the G string). In performance, that part is generally played by a single violin (instead of by the first violins as a group).

Bach's original

Bach's third Orchestral Suite in D major, composed in the first half of the 18th century, has an "Air" as second movement, following its French overture opening movement. The suite is composed for three trumpets, timpani, two oboes, strings (two violin parts and a viola part), and basso continuo. In the second movement of the suite however only the strings and the continuo play. This is the only movement of the suite where all other instruments are silent.

The music of the "Air" is written on four staves, for first and second violins, viola(s), and continuo. The interweaving melody lines of the high strings contrast with the pronounced rhythmic drive in the bass.

Wilhelmj's arrangement

In 1871, violinist August Wilhelmj arranged the second movement of Bach's third Orchestral Suite for violin and an accompaniment of strings, piano or organ (harmonium). On the score he wrote  (on the G string) above the staff for the solo violin, which gave the arrangement its nickname.

In Wilhelmj's version the piece is transposed down from its original key (D major) to C major. Then the part of the first violins is transposed further down an octave and given to a solo violin that can play the entire melody on its lowest string, the G string. The dynamic markings added by Wilhelmj are more in line with a romantic interpretation than with the baroque original.

As a violin can't play very loudly in its lowest register, all the other parts of Bach's music were firmly reduced in Wilhelmj's version: the keyboard part is to be played staccato and pianissimo, causing the effects of interweaving melodies and of drive in the bass part to get lost.

Later, a spurious story circulated that the melody was always intended to be played on the G string alone. The solo violin part of Wilhelmj's arrangement is sometimes played on the counter-tenor violoncello. 

Wilhelmj's arrangement greatly popularized the piece and although his version is rarely played anymore, his original title on the G string or Air on the G string has been retained as the commonly used name of various arrangements whether or not a string instrument playing on its G string is involved. Most of these versions have in common that the original melody of the first violins is played in the low register of a solo instrument, accompanied by a reduction of the material of the other parts of Bach's piece, although occasionally versions that stay more in line with Bach's original can go by the same name.

Reception 
In a period that stretched over three decades, and started in 1905, Henry Wood regularly programmed Wilhelmj's arrangement at the London Proms. Wood recorded his orchestral rendering (i.e., the G string part performed by a group of violins) of the Bach/Wilhelmj "Air" in the early 1930s.

Early recordings 
Recordings of Wilhelmj's "Air on the G String" arrangement, from the era preceding the Second World War, include:

Soldat-Roeger's recorded performance of the "Air on the G String" was the subject of scholarly analysis.

Appreciation of Wilhelmj's arrangement

In the early 20th century, Joseph Joachim called Wilhelmj's arrangement "a shameless falsification of a work by Bach". In 's XYZ der Muziek (1936, here quoted from the 1939 edition):

British musicologist Donald Francis Tovey likewise criticized Wihelmj's arrangement, stating that "At my concerts [the Air] will be heard as Bach wrote it, in its original D major as an angelic soprano strain, not in C major as a display of contralto depths."

In popular music
 The 1967 song "A Whiter Shade of Pale" by Procol Harum used a bar or two of "Air on the G String" as its starting point according to its writer Gary Brooker.
 The Dutch group Ekseption recorded a jazz-fusion version titled "Air" which reached No. 1 on the Dutch chart in 1969.
 The German group Sweetbox recorded a rap song "Everything's Gonna Be Alright" backed with music from "Air on the G String" in 1997, which became a world-wide hit.
 Swedish heavy metal band Sabaton used Air on the G String as the guitar solo for the song “Hearts of Iron,” the tenth track on their 2014 album Heroes.  
 The South Korean girl group Red Velvet uses its sample for their song "Feel My Rhythm" taken from their 2022 EP The ReVe Festival 2022 – Feel My Rhythm.

References

Sources

External links

 
 
 "Air on the G String" sheet music on MuseScore.com
 , cellist Julian Lloyd Webber

Arrangements of compositions by Johann Sebastian Bach